Y Ford Gron: papur Cymry'r byd ("The Round Table: a paper for the Welshmen of the world") was a popular monthly Welsh-language magazine containing news and articles on travel, fashion, the arts, and current events. It was illustrated, and included letters, editorials, and advertisements. It was published from 1930 to 1935.

Y Ford Gron was published by Hughes a'i Fab (Hughes and Son), founded in Wrexham in 1824. The company was a leading publisher of Welsh-language books, music, and journals, including Y Llenor. In 1982 the company was bought by S4C, the Welsh-language television channel.

The magazine has been digitized by the Welsh Journals Online project at the National Library of Wales.

References
The Oxford Companion to the Literature of Wales (1986), p. 203.

External links
Y Ford Gron at Welsh Journals Online

Welsh-language magazines
Literary magazines published in Wales
Magazines established in 1930
Magazines disestablished in 1935
Monthly magazines published in the United Kingdom
Defunct literary magazines published in the United Kingdom